Hilde Holovsky (29 April 1917 – 3 July 1933) was an Austrian figure skater. She was the 1931 World silver medalist, the 1933 World bronze medalist, and the 1931 European bronze medalist. At the 1931 World Championships, she was only 13 years old and finished second to Sonja Henie. Holovsky did not compete at the 1932 Winter Olympics or 1932 World Championships because her family could not afford to send her to North America, where both events took place.

Holovsky also competed in speed skating. In 1932, she set the Austrian record for ladies in the 500 meters. She died suddenly of appendicitis in July 1933.

Competitive highlights

References

 Skatabase
 Wiener Eislauf-Verein history
 Raymond Strait and Leif Henie: Queen of Ice, Queen of Shadows: The Unsuspected Life of Sonja Henie. .

External links
 

1933 deaths
Figure skaters from Vienna
Austrian female single skaters
Austrian female speed skaters
Year of birth unknown
World Figure Skating Championships medalists
European Figure Skating Championships medalists
1917 births